The Canoe Sprint men's VL3 event at the 2020 Paralympic Games took place on 2 and 4 September 2021. Two initial heats were held. Winners advanced directly to the final. The rest went into one of two semifinals, where the top three in each semifinal also advanced to the final.

Schedule

Results

Heats
Heat 1

Heat 2

Semifinals
Semifinal 1

Semifinal 2

Finals
Final B

Final A

References

Men's VL3